The W56 (originally called the Mark 56) was an American thermonuclear warhead produced starting in 1963 which saw service until 1993, on the Minuteman I and II ICBMs.

However unlike the B41, which was never tested at full yield, the W56 demonstrated its efficiency in the XW-56-X2 Bluestone shot of Operation Dominic in 1962.

Production of the Mod 1 warhead began in March 1963. The Mod 4 warhead began production in May 1967 and finished production in May 1969. 1,000 total were produced, of which 455 were Mod 4 warheads. The warheads were retired between 1991 and 1993, and the last W56 warhead was dismantled in June 2006. During dismantlement, one warhead which had high-performance but sensitive PBX in its explosive lenses is reported to have nearly detonated in 2005 when an unsafe amount of pressure was applied to the explosive while it was being disassembled.

History
The W56 program began with the need for two new warheads to arm Weapons System WS-133A, later known as Minuteman. The study, released in March 1958, suggested that two warhead designs be produced; a  warhead and a  warhead. These warheads were to have the maximum achievable yield within the specified weight and have an operational deployment date of mid-1962.

A feasibility study group met 5 May 1958 and having been asked to complete the study quickly, concluded after one day that the lightweight warhead requirement could be met through a modification of the W50 used in MGM-31 Pershing while the heavy warhead could be developed through a rework of the Navy's W47 warhead for Polaris A-1. Little action was taken on these findings during 1958 however, due to a lack of Minuteman funding.

A second feasibility study was published in March 1959 which reported that the weight of the W47 could be reduced and that as the US had suspended nuclear testing, focus on a design that did not require testing was required. Later that month, the Air Force Special Weapons Center accelerated the Minuteman program and requested a new availability date from Sandia who replied that the main restraint on availability was the need for six warhead flight tests approximately one year before production could begin. If the W47 was used without change, the tests could be completed by December 1959 but if the warhead was modified tests could extend by as much as a year.

In August the Joint Chiefs of Staff assigned the requirements for the warhead. AVCO Manufacturing were assigned development of the reentry vehicle.

In September, the military characteristics were specified and required ground and air burst fuzing, that the warhead require minimal servicing and that it be able to be left unattended for up to 3 years at a time. The warhead was to contain no primary power source unless the use of a ferromagnetic X-unit was required, and the warhead would contain an environmental safing device located in the warhead in a manner as to minimize the possibility of a sabotage nuclear detonation.

Development of the warhead was initially assigned to Lawrence Radiation Laboratory and in November 1959 the development names WX-56 and XW-56-X1 were assigned to the program. As no new materials were required by the program and all components were used in other projects, early production was scheduled from mid-1962.

Concurrently, the XW-56-X1 was developed. The warhead was to be an improved XW-56, but by August 1960, the Radiation Laboratory believed in treating the XW-56-X1 as an entirely new weapon, taking advantage of all possible design improvements. The intention at this point was for the XW-56-X1 to arm Minuteman, but if missiles were to become operational before the planned stockpile entry date of July 1963, the XW-56 would be used instead.

By August 1960 however, it became clear that Minuteman's production scheduled has slipped, and that producing the XW-56 as an interim warhead was less necessary, leading to questions as to if development of both weapons slowed the development of the XW-56-X1. The Radiation Laboratory believed that there was some benefit to having the less advanced but tested XW-56 alongside the more advanced but untested XW-56-X1, but field command believed there was no advantage to a mixture of tested and untested warheads, and instead requested that only the XW-56-X1 be produced. In December the Division of Military Applications cancelled the XW-56 warhead program.

In September 1960, XW-56-X1 apparently received a new primary stage design, developed by Los Alamos National Laboratory. The proposed ordnance characteristics of the weapon states that the warhead would be connected to the reentry vehicle though a single flange that provided cantilevered support of the warhead. This helped relieve thermal expansion issues between the warhead and reentry vehicle. The warhead also included a system to prevent transfer of boosting gas to the pit in the event of a fire. The warhead received approval as the Minuteman warhead on 13 October 1960.

The XW-56X-1 warhead, now called the Mark 56 Mod 1 had a planned availability date of April 1963. A series of flight tests of the warhead were conducted from July 1962 and the planned production date was May 1963. In June 1961 a new production date of February 1963 was requested alongside increased early production rates, but after discussing the difficulties in meeting this goal, the request was dropped.

However, in January 1962, a new requirement for the use of external initiation and a chopper-converter firing set was added. This produced the XW-56-X2 warhead. It was decided that the XW-56-X1 would no longer be designated the Mark 56 Mod 1, but that the XW-56-X2 would instead take the Mod 1 nomenclature. The warhead was design released in May 1962 and production began in March 1963.

In December 1962, it was noted that efforts were being made to harden the warhead against blast effects such as those from anti-ballistic missile systems. The decision was made to change the way the warhead was mounted to the reentry vehicle. Instead of a single flange, a honeycomb sleeve would be placed between the warhead and reentry vehicle, and would provide area loading. This interim design, the XW-56-X3 was given the production nomenclature Mark 56 Mod 2. The design as not interchangeable with the Mod 1 warhead and production was planned for April 1964.

The Mod 2 design was, with minor exceptions, identical to the Mod 1 design. Changes included new inertial switches as the originals could not survive the shocks involved, and a new neutron generator redesigned to improve the mounting system for the generator. The new reentry vehicle was called the Mark 11A. Production was achieved in August 1964.

In May 1966, Sandia National Laboratories and Livermore began work on a hard (high energy) x-ray hardening program for the W56. The exact changes made are still classified, but one portion was the inclusion of a forward shield. The modified warhead was designated the XW-56-X4 and given the production nomenclature of Mark 56 Mod 3. Existing Mod 2 warheads were retrofitted to the Mod 3 design. Early production was achieved in February 1967.

A final weapon, the Mark 56 Mod 4 began development in March 1967. The program was to further harden the weapon against the effects of x-rays. Production began in May 1967.

Mods and engineering names
The weapon had separate engineering and production (mod numbered) names.

See also
 LGM-30 Minuteman
 List of nuclear weapons
 United States and weapons of mass destruction

References

External links
List of all US nuclear weapons at nuclearweaponarchive.org
"Cold War Relic in Pieces, but Next Generation Looms" By Walter Pincus, The Washington Post, June 29, 2006
"Mishap in dismantling nuclear warhead" UPI.

Nuclear warheads of the United States
Military equipment introduced in the 1960s